Struża-Kolonia  is a village in the administrative district of Gmina Trawniki, within Świdnik County, Lublin Voivodeship, in eastern Poland.

The village has a population of 760.

References

Villages in Świdnik County